Malacoglanis gelatinosus is a species of catfish (order Siluriformes) of the family Trichomycteridae, and the only species of the genus Malacoglanis. This fish grows to about 2.0 centimetres (.79 in) SL. and is native to the Caquetá River basin of Colombia. Stauroglanis is the sister group to a monophyletic group formed by Malacoglanis and Sarcoglanis.

References

Trichomycteridae
Taxa named by George S. Myers
Taxa named by Stanley Howard Weitzman
Fish of South America
Freshwater fish of Colombia
Fish described in 1966